is a town located in Fukushima Prefecture, Japan. , the town had an estimated population of 3,304 in 1,269 households, and a population density of 19 persons per km².

Geography
Yanaizu is located in the northern portion of the Aizu region of Fukushima Prefecture.The Takitani River flows north and south through the town and joins the Tadami River, which crosses the northern part of the town. The southern part of the town is mountainous.

Mountains : Mount Hakase
Rivers : Tadami River, Takitani River

Neighboring municipalities
Fukushima Prefecture
Nishiaizu
Aizubange
Aizumisato
Shōwa
Mishima
Kaneyama

Climate
Yanaizu has a Humid continental climate (Köppen Dfb) characterized by warm summers and cold winters with heavy snowfall.  The average annual temperature in Yanaizu is 11.7 °C. The average annual rainfall is 1428 mm with September as the wettest month. The temperatures are highest on average in August, at around 25.3 °C, and lowest in January, at around -0.9 °C.

Demographics
Per Japanese census data, the population of Yanaizu has declined steadily over the past 70 years and is now much less than it was a century ago.

History
The area of present-day Yanaizu was part of ancient Mutsu Province. The area formed part of the holdings of Aizu Domain during the Edo period. After the Meiji Restoration, the area was organized as part of Kawanuma District, Fukushima Prefecture. The village of Yanaizu was founded with the establishment of the modern municipalities system on April 1, 1898. Yanaizu annexed the neighboring villages of Kurado and Iitani on May 1, 1921. The village was raised to town status on May 20, 1942. On March 31, 1955, Yanaizu annexed the neighboring village of Nishiyama from Ōnuma District, Fukushima.

Economy
The economy of Yanaizu is based primarily on agriculture, with seasonal tourism.

Education
Yanaizu has two public elementary schools and one public junior high school operated by the town government. The town does not have a high school.

Transportation

Railway
 JR East – Tadami Line
  -  -

Highway

Local attractions
 Enzō-ji, Buddhist temple, the site of a Hadaka Matsuri every January 7. This festival was featured in the NHK World program "Out & About" on February 10, 2008.
 Saitō Kiyoshi Art Museum
 Yanaizu Onsen
 Nishiama Onsen
 Meibutsu
 Akabeko
 Awa-manju - millet based steamed buns stuffed with red bean paste

References

External links

Official Website 

 
Towns in Fukushima Prefecture